Samuel Andreyev (born Samuel Curnoe Andreeff; 15 April 1981) is a Canadian composer, singer-songwriter, poet and educator who has resided in France since 2003. As of 2021, he had completed about 30  works, nearly all of which have been recorded commercially. His YouTube channel, his videos, interviews and podcasts have been viewed extensively. He currently teaches at the Hochschule für Musik Freiburg and at the Strasbourg Center of the University of Syracuse.

Life and career 
Andreyev was born and raised in Kincardine, Ontario, moving with his family to Toronto in 1988. There he enrolled in The Royal Conservatory of Music, studying cello and oboe, as well as composition. Additionally, he experimented on his own, fascinated by rare instruments and the possibilities offered by recording technology. While living in Toronto, he recorded 8 albums of songs, ran a small publishing house devoted to experimental poetry, performed with a troupe of local musicians, and completed his first acknowledged composition, Le malheur adoucit les pierres, a wind trio.

He settled in Paris in 2003 to study composition, initially with Allain Gaussin, then with Frédéric Durieux at the Paris Conservatoire. Shortly after graduating, he was named a member of the Académie de France à Madrid and offered a 1-year artistic residency at the Casa de Velázquez. Upon returning to France in 2013, he took up teaching positions, initially at the Conservatoire de Cambrai, and later at the Strasbourg Center of the University of Syracuse, and the Hochschule für Musik Freiburg. 

In the mid-2010s his work began to receive much wider attention, receiving major awards, including the Grand Prix du concours Henri Dutilleux in 2012 for his composition Night Division. 

He settled in Strasbourg in 2014. Starting in 2015, he embarked upon an ambitious project of making commercial recordings of all of his works. So far, 3 portrait CDs have been issued along with many individual works on various labels. 

In 2018, he was named a member of the music council of the Fondation Prince Pierre de Monaco.

Poetry 
Also a poet and writer, Andreyev has published two collection of poems: Evidence was issued in 2009 by Quattro Books of Toronto; The Relativistic Empire was published by Bookthug in 2015. A book of conversations about his life and work, written in collaboration with the French composer and musicologist Etienne Kippelen, was scheduled to be issued in the fall of 2021.

Select discography

Compositions 
Le malheur adoucit les pierres for bass flute, English horn and bassoon (2002)
Music with no Edges for five instruments (2004)
Passages for clarinet (2005)
Stopping for two vibraphones (2006)
Nets Move Slowly, Yet for ensemble (2006)
Night Division for ensemble (2008–10)
Vérifications for ensemble (2012)
A propos du concert de la semaine dernière for piano and 7 instruments (2013–15)
Strasbourg Quartet for flute, clarinet, percussion and cello (2014–15)
Piano Pieces I-IV for piano (2011–16)
Iridescent Notation cantata on texts by Tom Raworth for soprano and ensemble (2012–17)

Albums 
 Iridescent Notation (Vienna: Kairos Records, 2020)
 Music with no Edges (Vienna: Kairos Records, 2018)
 Moving (Paris: Klarthe Records, 2016)
 Compositeurs de la Casa de Velázquez (Madrid: Casa de Velázquez 2013)
 The Tubular West (Toronto: Torpor Vigil Records 2013)
 Songs of Elsewhere (Toronto: Torpor Vigil Records 2002)
 Swollows (Toronto: Torpor Vigil Records 2000)

Bibliography 

 2009 - Evidence 
 2015 - The Relativistic Empire 
 2018 - A Needy Chap

References

Sources 

 Evidence (Toronto: Quattro Books, 2009)

External links 
 Samuel Andreyev's YouTube channel
 Samuel Andreyev's personal web site
 Impronta Edition (Mannheim), publisher of Samuel Andreyev’s music
 Composers 21 page
 Samuel Andreyev's biography on Cdmc website

1981 births
Living people
People from Bruce County
The Royal Conservatory of Music alumni
Canadian composers
Writers from Ontario
Canadian male poets
Musicians from Ontario
21st-century Canadian male writers
21st-century Canadian poets
Canadian expatriates in France
21st-century Canadian composers